Marion Lawrence Shields (March 5, 1895 – February 19, 1976) was an American middle-distance runner who specialized in the 1500 meters. Around the time of the First World War he was a student at Mercersburg Academy and trained under the Scots American coach Jimmy Curran. Thereafter he attended Penn State. At the 1920 Summer Olympics he won a bronze medal in the 1500 m. He was also part of the gold medal-winning American team in the 3000 m race but he was not awarded a medal due to being one of the two weakest links of the team. Four years later Shields attempted to qualify for the Olympic Games in Paris, but failed.

In 1923 Shields began a 37-year-long career at Phillips Andover Academy as a biology teacher, coach, alumni director and member of the board of trustees. Shields fought with the U.S. Navy in World War I and II, retiring in the rank of Commodore in the Pacific.

See also
List of Pennsylvania State University Olympians

References

External links

 profile
 
 

1895 births
1976 deaths
American male middle-distance runners
Athletes (track and field) at the 1920 Summer Olympics
Olympic bronze medalists for the United States in track and field
People from Marblehead, Massachusetts
Medalists at the 1920 Summer Olympics
Sportspeople from Chester County, Pennsylvania
Sportspeople from Essex County, Massachusetts